Kodangal Assembly constituency is a constituency of Telangana Legislative Assembly, India. It is one of assembly constituencies in Vikarabad district. It is part of Mahabubnagar Lok Sabha constituency.

Patnam Narender Reddy of  Bharat Rashtra Samithi  is currently representing the constituency.

Mandals
The Assembly Constituency presently comprises the following Mandals:

Members of Legislative Assembly 
Members of Legislative State Assembly, who represented Kodangal.

 * In 1951 the state name was Hyderabad. It was changed to Andhra Pradesh after States Reorganisation Act of 1956 and 2014 elections were held in Telangana

Election results

Telangana Legislative Assembly election, 2014

Telangana Legislative Assembly election, 2018

See also
 List of constituencies of Telangana Legislative Assembly

References

Assembly constituencies of Telangana
Mahbubnagar district